Vasco Creti (7 December 1874 – 16 October 1945) was an Italian film actor. He appeared in more than 110 films between 1915 and 1944. He was married to actress Valeria Creti.

Selected filmography

 Maschiaccio (1917)
 Il siluramento dell'Oceania (1917)
 The Two Sergeants (1922)
 The Flight of Socrates (1923)
 The Last Days of Pompeii (1926)
 Company and the Crazy (1928)
 Sun (1929)
 The Man with the Claw (1931)
 Mother Earth (1931)
 Before the Jury (1931)
 The Charmer (1931)
 Palio (1932)
 Zaganella and the Cavalier (1932)
 The Gift of the Morning (1932)
 Pergolesi (1932)
 The Haller Case (1933)
 The Table of the Poor (1932)
 Creatures of the Night (1934)
 Aldebaran (1935)
 The Joker King (1935)
 The Ambassador (1936)
 God's Will Be Done (1936)
 La Damigella di Bard (1936)
 Pietro Micca (1938)
 The House of Shame (1938)
 The Widow (1939)
 Two Million for a Smile (1939)
 Guest for One Night (1939)
 The Faceless Voice (1939)
 A Thousand Lire a Month (1939)
 Who Are You? (1939)
 The Silent Partner (1939)
 It Always Ends That Way (1939)
 The Castle Ball (1939)
 No Man's Land (1939)
 Wealth Without a Future (1939)
 The Cavalier from Kruja (1940)
 The Sin of Rogelia Sanchez (1940)
 A Husband for the Month of April (1941)
 Blood Wedding (1941)
 Non ti pago! (1942)
 The Woman of Sin (1942)
 Music on the Run (1943)

References

External links

1874 births
1945 deaths
Actors from Florence
Italian male film actors
Italian male silent film actors
20th-century Italian male actors